The following is a list of Drake Bulldogs men's basketball head coaches at the Drake University in Des Moines, Iowa. The Drake Bulldogs men's basketball program has been led by 30 head coaches in their 115 season history. The sortable list below is by number of total Drake Bulldog program wins.

Maury John led the Drake Bulldogs to the  NCAA Division I Men's Final Four in 1969 and NCAA Tournament - Sweet 16 appearances in 1969, 1970 and 1971.

References

 
Drake Bulldogs
Drake Bulldogs basketball, men's, coaches
Drake Bulldogs men's basketball coaches